Katie Price: My Crazy Life is a reality TV show depicting the life of  Katie Price, a model and television personality.

Scenario 
Reality TV show that documents the life of model and television personality Katie Price.

Series overview 

Katie is a reality TV show depicting the life of Katie Price, a model and television personality.

Reception 
The show hit it off with high ratings - pulling in almost 5.5 million viewers across all platforms - original broadcasts, YouTube, TV repeats and online - the highest Sky Living has ever reached.

Broadcast 
The first three seasons of the show were broadcast on British television channel ITV2. Its first season, consisting of 6 episodes, aired from 27 August to 1 October 2009. Its first episode garnered 1.8 million viewers. The show's second season consisted of 8 episodes airing from 11 February to 1 April achieving an average of 2.3 million viewers; the 3-part wedding special Katie and Alex: For Better for Worse eventually followed on 14 July until 28 July 2010. The third season, the last with ITV2, was broadcast from 23 September until 11 November 2010.

Her 2-year contract with Sky Living saw a change for the show's fourth season in channel and name. This season is currently broadcast on Sky Living and is simply titled Katie to reflect the start of her new coalition with Sky. This was the first season to be broadcast in HD. The fourth season started on 22 March. The fifth and final series aired from 5 June to 10 August 2012.
The sixth season aired in late 2017, it is still going as of 19 August 2017 on Quest Red

References 

2009 British television series debuts
2000s British reality television series
2010s British reality television series
2020s British reality television series
English-language television shows
ITV reality television shows
Katie Price
Sky Living original programming
Television series by ITV Studios
British television series revived after cancellation